Beauty of the World is a 1927 silent Italian film directed by Mario Almirante. The film features an early onscreen performance from Vittorio De Sica.

Cast
 Italia Almirante-Manzini
 Renato Cialente
 Luigi Almirante
 Nini Dinelli
 Vittorina Benvenuti
 Guglielmo Barnabò
 Vittorio De Sica

References

External links

1927 films
Italian silent feature films
Italian black-and-white films
Films directed by Mario Almirante